Nélson Miguel Castro Oliveira  (born 8 August 1991) is a Portuguese professional footballer who plays as a striker for Greek Super League club PAOK.

Formed at S.L. Benfica, he made 24 appearances and scored three goals for the club, while spending most of his time out on loan. He represented four clubs in English football, and also played in France, Spain and Greece.

Oliveira earned 70 caps for Portugal across all youth levels combined. He made his debut for the senior side in 2012, and later that year was part of the Portugal squad that reached the semi-finals of UEFA Euro 2012.

Club career

Benfica
Born in Barcelos, Oliveira finished his youth career at Benfica having arrived at age 15 from Braga, and was a prolific scorer for both clubs. He made his first-team debut in a 2008–09 pre-season friendly against Estoril, courtesy of manager Quique Flores, and was even called to a UEFA Cup match against Napoli, but eventually returned to the juniors.

Loans in Portugal
The same happened to Oliveira in 2009–10. However, in January 2010, he made his professional – and first division – debuts, being loaned until June to Rio Ave; his first game came on 7 February, as he played the last 10 minutes of the 2–0 home win against Leixões.

Oliveira's loan was initially extended for the entirety of the 2010–11 season but, on 12 August 2010, he was loaned to Paços de Ferreira. He scored on his debut on 12 September, a 1–1 draw at Marítimo and, the following month, helped Paços come from behind at Naval (2–1) by netting the winning goal from a direct free kick.

On 14 October 2011, Oliveira made his official debut for Benfica, playing 45 minutes in a 2–0 away win against Portimonense for the season's Portuguese Cup. On 18 January of the following year, he played the entire game against Santa Clara for the League Cup group stage, and scored in a 2–0 home win; the following month, for the same competition – the Portuguese Football Federation ruled that, for the tournament, at least two national players would have to appear in a game for 45 minutes – he opened the score against Marítimo (3–0, home).

On 6 March 2012, Oliveira made his Champions League debut, playing only ten minutes but scoring the final goal in a 2–0 home win against Zenit Saint Petersburg, with Benfica qualifying to the last-eight 4–3 on aggregate.

Loan to Deportivo La Coruña

On 31 July, he moved to Deportivo de La Coruña in Spain in a season-long loan, alongside several compatriots.

On 20 August, in the La Liga opener against Osasuna, Oliveira scored his first goal for the Galicians, netting from a counter-attack in the 90th minute to make it 2–0 for the hosts. On 19 May 2013, he found himself in controversy after shushing the Ultras after his goal against Espanyol. He later apologized for his actions. During his spell, he acted as backup to veteran Riki.

Loan to Stade Rennais
On 26 July 2013, Oliveira was loaned to Ligue 1 club Stade Rennais on a season-long move, with the French having the option to make the deal permanent afterwards. He scored his first goal in his second appearance, in a 1–2 loss at Nice.

Oliveira scored twice for Rennes on 24 August 2013, in a 2–1 away win against Evian. He again scored twice, this time against Toulouse in a 5–0 win on 26 October 2013. A week later he scored his seventh goal of the season in a 1–1 draw away to Marseille. After a four-month goal drought, he found the net again against Toulouse in a 3–2 loss on 15 March 2014. He took part of the 2014 Coupe de France Final coming on as a substitute in Rennes' 2–0 loss to Guingamp.

Loan to Swansea City
After receiving rarely any playing time, on 23 December 2014, Benfica announced that they had loaned Oliveira to Premier League side Swansea City until the end of the season. He was brought in to replace Wilfried Bony, who was due to miss all of Swansea's January matches due to commitments with the Ivory Coast national team at the Africa Cup of Nations. He made his debut on 10 January, replacing Gylfi Sigurðsson for the last 16 minutes of a 1–1 draw against West Ham United at the Liberty Stadium. A week later, with Bony having been sold to Manchester City, Oliveira started alongside Bafétimbi Gomis in a 0–5 defeat to league leaders Chelsea. On 25 April 2015, Oliveira scored his first goal for Swansea, equalising as they came from behind to win 3–2 away at Newcastle United.

Loan to Nottingham Forest
On 4 September 2015, Oliveira returned to the United Kingdom, joining Nottingham Forest of the Football League Championship on loan for the remainder of the 2015–16 season. He made his debut eight days later away to Queens Park Rangers, replacing Kyle Ebecilio in the 69th minute, and scored the winning goal as they came from behind to triumph 2–1 at Loftus Road.

He had a run of games in the first team but did not score again until 6 November, netting the only goal of the game against Forest's local rivals Derby County. He added to his goal tally two games later by scoring a brace against Reading. The first was a curled strike from 20 yards after a quick counterattack and the second, a volley from close range.

He took his goal tally to five after firing a low curling shot after a deft touch against MK Dons. A week later, he scored against Leeds United. He finished the season as the team's highest goalscorer with nine goals.

Norwich City
On 30 August 2016, Oliveira joined Norwich City on a four-year deal with the club. He became Norwich's fifth signing of the transfer window, signing for an undisclosed fee. In the next four games, he found the net on three occasions against Barnsley, Aston Villa and Reading respectively.

On 2 January 2017, Oliveira scored his first professional hat-trick in 3–0 win against Derby County. The following game, he received his first red card after he lashed out on Rotherham United defender Kirk Broadfoot. He returned from suspension, scoring a looping header against Wigan Athletic on 7 February 2017.

In early February, Oliveira sustained a foot injury which caused him to be out for five weeks. He returned from injury on 18 March 2017, as a late substitute against Barnsley. He scored a brace against Leeds United on 29 April 2017, and finished the season with 15 goals in 32 games in all competitions (including Football League Trophy) for Norwich, a career high tally for him.

Oliveira ended his first pre-season in 2017 with Norwich, scoring five goals in eight games. After scoring a late equalizer against Fulham on the first day of the 2017–18 season, after coming on as a substitute on 5 August 2017, he proceeded to take his shirt off and angrily reveal his name towards manager, Daniel Farke. After the game Farke played down the controversy saying emotions got the better of him after being left on the bench. During the 2017–18 Norwich City F.C. season, Oliveira scored 8 goals in 36 appearances (10 as a substitute), finishing as the club's second top scorer behind James Maddison.

The following season, Oliveira was frozen-out from the squad by Farke, after failing to make a move during the summer transfer window.

Loan to Reading
On 22 January 2019, Oliveira joined fellow Championship side Reading on loan until the end of the season. He made his debut a week later and scored in a 1–1 draw at Bolton Wanderers.

On 2 February 2019, Oliveira was badly injured during a match against Aston Villa when he was tussling for the ball with Villa defender Tyrone Mings; he fell and had his face trod on. Oliveira suffered bad gashes on his face and a broken nose, and was taken to the Royal Berkshire Hospital for treatment. Mings later apologised to Oliveira on Twitter, insisting that it was not intentional; both Oliveira and the Reading coach José Manuel Gomes stated their opinion that Mings could have avoided making contact. As referee Geoff Eltringham had seen the incident and determined that it was accidental, no retrospective action was taken.

AEK Athens
On 20 July 2019, Oliveira signed a two-year contract with Super League Greece club AEK Athens. He scored a late goal as AEK lost 2–1 at home to Xanthi in the opening match of the season, and scored again the following week in a 3–2 win away to Asteras Tripolis. Oliveira scored twice, including a stoppage-time winner, as AEK came back from a goal behind to beat Atromitos 3–2 on 3 November. On 7 December, he scored a hat-trick in a 5–0 home win against Panionios.

On 16 January 2020, Oliveira returned from an injury and converted a penalty in a 1–1 away draw against Asteras Tripolis in the first leg of the round of 16 of the Greek Cup. The same month, there were Greek reports that Wolverhampton Wanderers had expressed interest in him, to provide reliable backup to Raúl Jiménez. The English club submitted an official offer in the region of €4 million, but it was immediately turned down as AEK would only accept the €6.5 million buy-out clause.

On 5 July 2020, Oliveira netted a brace, in a 4–1 win at the Kleanthis Vikelidis Stadium against Aris. On 24 September 2020, Oliveira scored the only goal with a rebound after he missed a penalty kick sealing a 1–0 away 2020–21 UEFA Europa League third qualifying round win against FC St. Gallen. On 13 December 2020, he sealed an eventual 4–3 away win against Apollon Smyrnis. The following 15 February, he scored a brace in a 4–2 away win against AEL.

PAOK 
On 9 July 2021, Greek Super League club PAOK announced the signing of Oliveira. On 18 August 2021, Nelson Oliveira was injured during PAOK’s match against Bohemian F.C. in the UEFA Europa Conference League. Following medical examinations, the diagnosis is a partial rupture of the anterior cruciate ligament, and his absence is estimated to six months.

International career

Youth
Oliveira represented the Portugal under-17 team in the qualification for the 2008 UEFA European Championship. In 2009, he was named in the squad for the European Under-19 Championship qualifying tournament, but the country failed to ensure a place in the finals in Ukraine; the following year, in the same category, he represented the nation at European Championship, scoring one goal in the 2–0 win against Italy.

On 22 May 2011 Oliveira was selected by the under-20s for the 2011 Toulon Tournament, where he played three matches and netted once. He also helped the team finish second in that year's FIFA World Cup held in Colombia, scoring four goals – including one in the final against Brazil, a 2–3 extra time loss – and providing two assists. He received the Man of the match award twice in addition to the Silver Ball for the second best player in the tournament.

Oliveira made his debut for the under-21 team on 6 October 2011, in a Euro 2013 qualification match against Poland. On 11 November, for the same competition, he scored a brace against Moldova (5–0 home win).

Senior team
On 24 February 2012, Oliveira was called up for the first time to the senior team, for a friendly match with Poland five days later. He replaced Nani for the last ten minutes of the 0–0 draw in Warsaw, and eventually made it to the list of 23 for UEFA Euro 2012.

Oliveira played 20 minutes in the group stage opener against Germany after coming on for Hélder Postiga, in an eventual 0–1 loss. He made three other substitute appearances in the tournament, in an eventual semi-final exit.

In Portugal's next game after Euro 2012, Oliveira scored his first international goal, in a 2–0 win against Panama.

After an absence of nearly two years, Oliveira was called up by Fernando Santos for World Cup qualifiers against the Faroe Islands and Hungary. He replaced André Silva in the eighty-first minute, and three minutes later scored the fifth and final goal of Portugal's 5–1 win against the Faroe Islands.

Style of play
Oliveira plays as a centre forward, known for his hold up play, his strength, and technique, in 2012, Oliveira was referred to as 'Portugal's Cantona' due to similarities in the 'style' of play between him and Eric Cantona.

Career statistics

Club

International

Scores and results list Portugal's goal tally first, score column indicates score after each Oliveira goal.

Honours

Club
Paços de Ferreira
Taça da Liga: runner-up 2010–11

Benfica
Taça da Liga: 2011–12

Rennes
Coupe de France: runner-up 2013–14

PAOK
Greek Cup: ;runner-up :2021–22

International
Portugal U20
FIFA U-20 World Cup runner-up: 2011

Individual
FIFA U-20 World Cup: Silver Ball 2011
Golden Globes (Portugal): Best Newcomer 2012

Orders
 Knight of the Order of Prince Henry

References

External links

 
 
 
 
 
 National team data 

1991 births
Living people
People from Barcelos, Portugal
Portuguese footballers
Association football forwards
S.L. Benfica footballers
Rio Ave F.C. players
F.C. Paços de Ferreira players
Deportivo de La Coruña players
Stade Rennais F.C. players
Swansea City A.F.C. players
Nottingham Forest F.C. players
Norwich City F.C. players
Reading F.C. players
AEK Athens F.C. players
PAOK FC players
Primeira Liga players
La Liga players
Ligue 1 players
Premier League players
English Football League players
Super League Greece players
Golden Globes (Portugal) winners
Portugal youth international footballers
Portugal under-21 international footballers
Portugal international footballers
UEFA Euro 2012 players
Portuguese expatriate footballers
Portuguese expatriate sportspeople in Spain
Portuguese expatriate sportspeople in France
Portuguese expatriate sportspeople in Wales
Portuguese expatriate sportspeople in England
Portuguese expatriate sportspeople in Greece
Expatriate footballers in Spain
Expatriate footballers in France
Expatriate footballers in Wales
Expatriate footballers in England
Expatriate footballers in Greece
Sportspeople from Braga District